The Canada Pension Plan Investment Board (CPPIB), operating as CPP Investments, is a Canadian Crown corporation established by way of the 1997 Canada Pension Plan Investment Board Act to oversee and invest the funds contributed to and held by the Canada Pension Plan (CPP).

CPP Investments is one of the world's largest investors in private equity, having invested over US$28.1 billion between 2010 and 2014 alone. Despite being a Crown corporation, CPPIB is not considered a sovereign wealth fund because it operates at arm's length from the Government of Canada and solely manages CPP contributions paid by workers and employers, not public funds.

As of June 30, 2022, the CPP Investment Board manages over C$523 billion in assets under management for the Canada Pension Plan on behalf of 20 million Canadians.

History

The Canada Pension Plan was first established in 1966. For much of its history, the plan relied on contributions to pay benefits. By 1996, the federal government had determined that the CPP as then constituted was unsustainable. Changes were made to the plan, gradually increasing the contribution rate to its current 9.9% and creating the CPP Investment Board.

Under the direction of then Minister of Finance Paul Martin, the CPP Investment Board was created by an Act of Parliament in 1997 as an independent, but accountable, body to monitor the funds held by the Canada Pension Plan. The CPP Investment Board began its investing program in 1999, establishing the CPP Reserve Fund to hold investment earnings and CPP contributions not needed to pay current pensions. It reports quarterly to the public on its performance, has a professional board of directors to oversee the operations of the CPP reserve fund, and also to plan changes in direction. As a Crown corporation, the CPP Investment Board is accountable to Parliament and reports annually through the Minister of Finance. While accountable to Parliament, the CPP Investment Board is not controlled by the government or subject to government appointments, its employees and directors are not part of the Public Service of Canada. CPPIB is a partner of the World Economic Forum.

Mandate
The CPP Investment Board's mandate is laid out in its founding legislation, the Canada Pension Plan Investment Board Act (S.C. 1997, c. 40). Its sole investing mandate is to achieve a "maximum rate of return, without undue risk of loss."

Investments
The CPP Investment Board invests in private equity, public companies, and real estate. The CPPIB invests in real estate and made their first direct office investment in Seattle in 2016.  Notable investments include 50% of the American pet store chain Petco, 50% of American luxury department store chain Neiman Marcus, 50% of Australian office tower development International Towers Sydney, 50.01% of the Ontario Highway 407 toll highway, 21.5% of South Korean discount store chain Homeplus, and 19.8% of multinational media corporation Entertainment One. Other prominent investments are made in Indian companies Byju's, Delhivery, Embassy Office Parks, Eruditus, Power Grid Corporation of India, SBI Life Insurance Company etc.

As outlined in its Policy on Responsible Investing, first adopted in 2005, the Board considers environmental, social and governance (ESG) issues/factors from a risk/return point of view and encourages companies to adopt policies and practices that enhance long-term financial performance.

Future and direction
John Graham is the current Chief Executive Officer of the CPPIB, replacing Mark Machin on February 26, 2021. Mark Machin resigned after traveling to the United Arab Emirates to receive a COVID-19 vaccine. Prior to Machin, Mark Wiseman was CEO until June 13, 2016.

According to the 2013 Annual Report, about 63% of the fund's assets are now invested outside Canada, largely in the United States, Europe and Asia. In addition, the CPPIB has been broadening the scope of its investments to include emerging markets, although David Denison, CEO at the time, would not pinpoint a specific country or area. "Canada as a single market cannot accommodate the future growth of our organization," said Denison.

In recent years, the CPPIB changed direction in its investment philosophy. It evolved from investing exclusively in non-marketable government bonds to passive index-fund strategies and, in 2006, to active investment strategies.

Growth and strategy
According to the Office of the Chief Actuary of Canada, the CPP Fund needs a real rate of return of 4.0%, over the 75-year projection period in his report, to help sustain the plan at the current contribution rate.

In December 2013, the Chief Actuary reaffirmed that the CPP is sustainable throughout the 75-year timeframe of his 2012 report. Over this long timeframe it is expected that there will be periods where returns are above or below this threshold.

Consistent with the CPPIB's mandate to maximize investment returns without undue risk of loss, they pursue a value-added strategy that seeks to deliver returns over and above a market-based benchmark over the long term. That benchmark is called the CPP Reference Portfolio and under reasonable capital market assumptions, it can generate the long-term 4.0% real rate of return required to help sustain the CPP.

The CPPIB reserve fund receives its funds from the CPP and invests them like a typical large fund manager would. The CPP reserve fund seeks to achieve at least the projected return (inflation-adjusted) needed to help sustain the CPP , a rate set at 4.0% by 2017 in the CPP actuary's report, starting from 3.2% in 2011. As indicated in its Financial Highlights for the fiscal year ended March 31, 2013, the CPP reserve fund averaged 4.2% return in the past 5 years, and a 7.4% return in the past 10 years, above the sum of projected Canadian inflation rates and the 4.0% target identified by the CPP Actuary report, or 6.3% in nominal basis, that is required for CPP contribution sustainability.

The CPP total assets are projected to reach the following levels according to the 2021 actuarial report: (in assets):

 $671 billion by 2025.
 $991 billion by 2030.
 $1,959 billion by 2040.
 $3,562 billion by 2050.

The strategies used to achieve these targets are:

Diversification. In 1997, the CPP fund was 100% invested in government bonds, but it has since diversified not only by asset class, but also internationally.
Employing basic asset allocation theories, with diversification of investments as one of the objectives. The asset mix has evolved over the years as follows:

Using equity firms to assist in achieving targets for each asset class. The CPP reserve fund allocates certain amounts to various pre-qualified equity firms to be managed and used towards reaching the growth targets. For example, the CPP Investment Board hires private equity firms to help it invest in private companies, fund managers to help it invest in public equities, bond managers to assist in investing in bonds (within Canada and foreign bonds), and so forth.

Significant transactions
CPPIB, as part of a consortium, first invested US$300 million in Skype in September 2009. In May 2011 CPPIB sold its stake in Skype to Microsoft for US$1.1 Bn before debt repayment, or US$933 million.

In 2009 CPPIB also invested in the $5.2-billion purchase of IMS Health with Texas Pacific Group and the $2.1-billion purchase of Macquarie Communications Group.

In 2012 CPPIB acquired a 45% stake in ten shopping centers and two redevelopment sites from Westfield Group.  CPPIB's equity investment was $1.8 billion and the total gross value of the properties was $4.8 billion.

In May 2015, Unibail-Rodamco revealed it had signed an agreement with the Canada Pension Plan Investment Board to sell its 46.1 percent stake in German shopping mall operator MFI AG for €394 million.

In May 2015, the sale of a joint 70% investment with BC Partners in U.S. cable television operator Suddenlink for over US$9 Bn to Altice was also announced. The interest had been acquired in a 2012 leveraged buyout.

In June 2015, CPPIB announced it would acquire GE Capital's private equity lending portfolio for $12 billion.

In October 2015, CPPIB announced plans to acquire Encana's Denver-Julesberg Basin Colorado oil and gas assets for $900 million (US). The deal, with Denver-based partner, private equity firm The Broe Group, having a 5% share in the new Crestone Peak Resources partnership, was completed in July 2016. Broe will manage the portfolio of more than 1600 wells.

In November 2015, CPPIB and CVC Capital Partners acquired American pet supplier Petco in a deal worth $4.6 billion.

In July 2016, CPPIB and Calgary-based Wolf Midstream Inc. purchased a 50% stake in Devon Energy's Access Pipeline located in Alberta.

In September 2016, CPPIB and Cinven acquired the business-to-business accommodation wholesaler Hotelbeds for a purchase price of around €1.3 billion.

In October 2019, CPPIB announced to invest alongside KKR in acquiring stake in German Axel Springer SE. CPPIB's financial commitment will be at least €500 million.

Performance
The performance and the market value of the CPP Fund is reported on a quarterly basis.

Investments held by the CPP Fund include equities, fixed income (primarily government bonds), and inflation-sensitive assets (real estate, inflation-linked bonds and infrastructure).  The CPPIB is making a major push into real estate, especially real estate in India.

Historical information on the performance of assets available to the Canada Pension Plan, and financial statements of the CPP Investment Board, can be found under the Quarterly Reports and Annual Reports section of the CPPIB's website.

The total growth of the CPP Reserve Fund is derived from the CPP contributions of working Canadians, and the return on investment of the contributions. The portion of CPP Reserve Fund growth due to CPP contributions varies from year to year, but have shown a slight decrease in the past 3 years. The historical growth with the investment performance is tabulated as follows:

¹Assets are as at the period end date (March 31).

²Commencing in fiscal 2007, the rate of return reflects the performance of the CPP Fund which excludes the short-term cash required to pay current benefits.

³Increased fund value due to worker and employer CPP contributions not needed to pay current benefits. The negative investment return amounted to $303 million CAD.

Board of directors

Heather Munroe-Blum 
Sylvia Chrominska
Dean Connor
William ‘Mark’ Evans
Ashleigh Everett
Tahira Hassan
Chuck Magro
John Montalbano
Barry Perry
Mary Phibbs
Boon Sim
Kathleen Taylor

Criticism
In 2009 executives of the Canada Pension Plan Investment Board took a 31.4% cut in their bonuses after questions were raised about the level of compensation at the crown corporation.

As worldwide concern for global climate change implications increasingly call on institutional divestment from fossil fuels, CPPIB has also been criticized for failing to do so, both on climate grounds and financial loss.

In May 2019, Conservative MP Tom Kmiec (Calgary Shepard) criticized the CPPIB during a meeting of the Canadian House of Commons Standing Committee on Finance for its indirect investments in two Chinese firms, Hikvision and Dahua Technology, which supply surveillance technology to the Chinese government used to repress Uyghurs in China's western Xinjiang region. CPPIB CEO Mark Machin stated that the holdings are part of indices which CPPIB invests in and that those investments had been red-flagged for potential future divestment.

The firms former CEO Mark Machin resigned as a consequence of controversy surrounding his choice to receive the COVID-19 vaccine in the United Arab Emirates, whilst Canada was still struggling to acquire vaccines. Mark Wiseman, Machin's predecessor, was fired from his role subsequent to his time at CPPIB. At BlackRock, Wiseman was seen as a potential successor to Larry Fink, but a whistleblower outed his romantic affair with a BlackRock employee.

See also
 Caisse de dépôt et placement du Québec
 Public Sector Pension Investment Board
 OMERS

References

External links
Official website

1997 establishments in Ontario
Financial services companies established in 1997
Canadian companies established in 1997
Investment in Canada
Canada Pension Plan
Investment management companies of Canada
Social security in Canada
Federal departments and agencies of Canada
Canadian federal Crown corporations
Companies based in Toronto